Anthony Lloyd Evans Cook (born 10 August 1989) is an English footballer who plays for Cray Wanderers.

Club career
Cook made his debut for Dagenham & Redbridge and first professional appearance on 15 December 2007, in the 4–0 defeat away to Shrewsbury Town.

Cook featured in the second series of Sky1's reality show Football Icon, where he finished in 4th place after picking up an injury. Shortly after Football Icon he went on trials at Tottenham Hotspur and Cardiff City where he signed for the latter, going on to represent the Bluebirds at reserve and youth team level.

He joined Concord Rangers after leaving Dagenham & Redbridge by mutual consent but joined Braintree Town in March 2009. After impressing during pre-season, Cook was signed for Chelmsford City in July 2009. On 2 February 2013, Cook replaced Stuart Searle in goal against Hayes & Yeading United, playing 84 minutes, following an injury to Chelmsford's first choice goalkeeper. During the game, Cook was on the receiving end of racial abuse from a member of the away support.

In 2013, Cook then opted to sign a one-year deal with Ebbsfleet United after a trial with Colchester United. After signing on for another season, Cook departed the club in January 2015, much to the disappointment of supporters. He signed for league rivals Bromley on 16 January 2015. After winning the Conference South title with Bromley and having a promising start to life in the National League, his old club returned for his services and he eventually departed the club in December 2015, joining Ebbsfleet United for an undisclosed fee. In 2017, Cook was part of the Ebbsfleet side that achieved promotion to the National League, despite picking up in a first half red card against former club Chelmsford City in the play-off final.

On 12 January 2018, Cook joined fellow National League side Woking on loan for the remainder of the campaign. A day later, he made his Woking debut during their 1–0 home defeat against Tranmere Rovers, playing the full 90 minutes. Cook went on to appear sixteen more times for the Cards, before returning to Ebbsfleet in April, prior to their playoff campaign.

On 16 May 2018, Cook announced via Twitter, that he would be leaving Ebbsfleet at the end of the current campaign, following the expiration of his contract.

On 22 June 2018, Dulwich Hamlet announced that Cook had signed a pre-contract agreement, and would be joining the club ahead of their inaugural season in the National League South. On 1 July 2019, he then joined Welling United.

Personal life
He is the older brother of fellow professional footballers Reice Charles-Cook and Regan Charles-Cook. Cook's uncle, James, is a former British super middleweight boxing champion.

Career statistics

References

External links
Anthony Cook player profile at daggers.co.uk

1989 births
Living people
English footballers
English people of Jamaican descent
Association football wingers
Croydon Athletic F.C. players
Dagenham & Redbridge F.C. players
Concord Rangers F.C. players
Carshalton Athletic F.C. players
Braintree Town F.C. players
Chelmsford City F.C. players
Ebbsfleet United F.C. players
Bromley F.C. players
Woking F.C. players
Dulwich Hamlet F.C. players
Welling United F.C. players
Cray Wanderers F.C. players
English Football League players
Footballers from the London Borough of Hackney
Black British sportsmen
Outfield association footballers who played in goal